Copelatus ternatensis is a species of diving beetle. It is part of the subfamily Copelatinae in the family Dytiscidae. It was described by Régimbart, 1899.

References

ternatensis
Beetles described in 1899